Mesoplia dugesi is a species of bee in the family Apidae. It is found in Arizona and Mexico.

References

Apinae
Insects described in 1917